The Little Drummer Girl is a 1984 American spy drama film directed by George Roy Hill and adapted from the 1983 novel of the same name by John le Carré. It starred Diane Keaton, Yorgo Voyagis, Klaus Kinski and Thorley Walters. The film received divided reviews among critics.

Plot 

Set in Europe and the Middle East, the plot follows the Mossad's clandestine attempt to flush out a PLO bomber named Khalil. To neutralize Khalil, they first kidnap (and later kill) his brother who is on a lecture tour, speaking to audiences in a ski mask about the profound suffering and losses of Palestine under military occupation.

Charlie, an anti-Zionist American actress working in London, has been lured to Greece on the pretense of shooting a wine commercial. There she meets and is seduced by Joseph, who tricks her into believing he is the masked man she met in the UK. She is kidnapped to a house of the Israeli Mossad (set up the fake commercial gig) to be recruited there, and be convinced that they too want peace and end the mutual killing. Monitored and manipulated thus, Charlie proves to be capable, acting well in the Mossad's narrative, and then arrives to a Palestinian resistance headquarters in a bombed-out city, whose leader Tayeh, though unsure of it, sends her on to a desert guerrilla maneuvers training camp.

Tayeh clarifies that the PLO are not anti-Semitic, but anti-Zionist, and advances her to the next assignment. Now as double agent, under the Israeli Mossad cover, Charlie impersonates the dead man's girlfriend, she connects with a man she deduces is Khalil. They set up an exploding briefcase that has its bomb signature, properly wrapped with coil of wire. As Charlie delivers the briefcase to the "peacenik" target, Professor Minkel, the Mossad, who have been monitoring the situation, have the briefcase whisked away by a man in a bomb suit. Charlie returns to Khalil, and they drive away after the large building explosion that she knows is a false flag event, harming no one. Although the evening news report casualties to fool Khalil, he is not easily disarmed, fails to fall asleep as planned, yet he grows quite suspicious of unusual silence around their country refuge. Khalil removes the batteries from Charlie's portable radio that contains a tracker and secret button for signaling when he falls asleep. Alerted, Joseph and others of the Mossad team move in to kill Khalil, as Mossad agents kill other PLO recruiting agents. All of the Palestinian guerrillas are destroyed and engulfed by flames from jet bombers.

In an Israeli hospital, Charlie is physically unharmed but emotionally wrecked, feeling betrayed because she only wanted to help Palestinians and end the killing. Ultimately, the Israeli Mossad exploited her to slaughter every Palestinian she met. Eventually she returns to acting in the UK but, too broken, walks off stage. Joseph is there and tells Charlie his real name, restates that he is finished with killing and does not know what is right and wrong, but he loves her. She says she is dead. They walk off together into the night.

Cast 

 Diane Keaton as Charlie
 Yorgo Voyagis as Joseph
 Klaus Kinski as Martin Kurtz
 Sami Frey as Khalil
 Michael Cristofer as Tayeh
 Eli Danker as Litvak
 Ben Levine as Dimitri
 Jonathan Sagall as Teddy
 Shlomit Hagoel as Rose
 Juliano Mer as Julio
 Sabi Dorr as Ben
 Doron Nesher as David
 Smadar Brener as Toby
 Shoshi Marciano as Rachel
 Philipp Moog as Aaron
 Bill Nighy as Al
 David Suchet as Mesterbein
 John le Carré as Commander

Response 
The film opened to mixed reviews from critics. People Magazine (U.S., Vol.22 No.7) began their review: "Diane Keaton will be a long time living down this film."  The New York Times said, "Everybody connected with the film behaves as if he were hanging onto the tail of a tiger and can't let go. They desperately clutch the material but never tame it." James Sanford in the April 9, 2004, Kalamazoo Gazette, referred to the film as an "Underrated thriller with a typically solid Keaton performance ... 3/5".

The Little Drummer Girl currently holds a 71% rating on Rotten Tomatoes based on seven reviews.

References

External links 

 
 

1980s spy thriller films
1984 films
American political thriller films
American spy thriller films
Films about actors
Films about the Mossad
Films based on works by John le Carré
Films directed by George Roy Hill
Films scored by Dave Grusin
Films set in England
Films set in West Germany
Films set in Greece
Films set in Munich
Films set in Palestine (region)
Films set in the Middle East
Films shot in Greece
Warner Bros. films
1980s English-language films
1980s American films